Ivet Musons Gimeno (born 17 June 1992) is a Spanish female handballer for CB Elche Mustang and the Spanish national team.

References 

Living people
1992 births
Spanish female handball players
People from Vallès Occidental
Sportspeople from the Province of Barcelona
Handball players from Catalonia
Competitors at the 2018 Mediterranean Games
Mediterranean Games gold medalists for Spain
Mediterranean Games medalists in handball